The 2003–04 Alpha Ethniki was the 68th season of the highest football league of Greece. The season began on 23 August 2003 and ended on 22 May 2004. Panathinaikos won their 19th Greek title and their first one in eight years.

Teams

Stadia and personnel

 1 On final match day of the season, played on 22 May 2004.
 2 AEK Athens were played the home matches at the various stadiums in Attica due to the demolition of Nikos Goumas Stadium and the renovation of Athens Olympic Stadium.

League table

Results

Relegation play-off
Played at a neutral venue (Makedonikos Stadium, Thessaloniki), between the 14th-place team in the Alpha Ethniki and the 3rd-place team in the Beta Ethniki.

Ergotelis were promoted to 2004–05 Alpha Ethniki. Akratitos were relegated to 2004–05 Beta Ethniki.

Top scorers
Source: Galanis Sports Data

References

External links
Greek SuperLeague official Site
SuperLeague Statistics

Alpha Ethniki seasons
Greece
1